Heddlu is the Welsh-language word for police and may refer to:

Wales 
 Dyfed–Powys Police (Welsh: Heddlu Dyfed Powys)
 Gwent Police (Welsh: Heddlu Gwent)
 North Wales Police (Welsh: Heddlu Gogledd Cymru)
 South Wales Police (Welsh: Heddlu De Cymru)

United Kingdom 
 British Transport Police (Welsh: Heddlu Trafnidiaeth Prydeinig)
 Civil Nuclear Constabulary (Welsh: Heddlu Sifil Niwclear), responsible for providing security at nuclear sites and during transportation of nuclear materials in the UK